The Taichung Military Kindred Village Museum is a museum in Beitun District, Taichung, Taiwan.

History
The museum building was originally part of the Beitun New Village, which was one of 134 military kindred villages in the city accommodating officers from the Republic of China Air Force rank major and above, including their families. Since the 2000s, there had been more and more families moving out from the area. The village was then renovated to preserve some of the iconic landmarks. One of the house was then turned into the Taichung Military Kindred Village Museum. The construction of the museum was completed in mid November 2014. Since August 2017, the museum has been run by Yuguo Cultural and Creative Company.

Architecture
The museum space spans over an area of 660 m2.

Transportation
The museum is accessible within walking distance southwest of Taiyuan Station of Taiwan Railways.

See also
 List of museums in Taiwan

References

External links

 

2014 establishments in Taiwan
Museums established in 2014
Museums in Taichung
Military dependents' village, Taiwan